The South Forty-Foot Drain, also known as the Black Sluice Navigation, is the main channel for the land-drainage of the Black Sluice Level in the Lincolnshire Fens.  It lies in eastern England between Guthram Gowt and the Black Sluice pumping station on The Haven, at Boston. The Drain has its origins in the 1630s, when the first scheme to make the Fen land available for agriculture was carried out by the Earl of Lindsey, and has been steadily improved since then. Water drained from the land entered The Haven by gravity at certain states of the tide until 1946, when the Black Sluice pumping station was commissioned.

The Drain was navigable until 1971, when improvements to the pumping station led to the entrance lock being removed. It is currently being upgraded to navigable status by the Environment Agency, as part of the Fens Waterways Link, with a new entrance lock being completed in December 2008, giving access to the first  of the drain, and the upgrading of the southern section, including a link to the River Glen to allow navigation to Spalding forming phase 2 of the project.

History
The Lincolnshire Fens are an area of low-lying land which have been subject to flooding and attempts to prevent it for centuries. In medieval times, the Midfen Dyke was built to drain the area, but by 1500, this was regarded less as a drain for the land than as a boundary marker between the Parts of Holland and the Parts of Kesteven, two of the three medieval subdivisions of Lincolnshire which functioned as county councils until their abolition in 1974. The first serious attempt to drain the area to the south west of Boston, now known as the Black Sluice Area but formerly known as the Lindsey Level, was from 1635 to 1638, when the Earl of Lindsey agreed with the Commissioners of Sewers for Lincolnshire to carry out drainage works which would make  of land available for agricultural use. The Earl and a group of Adventurers paid for the works, in return for land grants.

The cost of the work was £45,000, and involved the construction of a sluice near Boston, called Skirbeck Sluice, the construction of the first  of the South Forty-Foot Drain, from Boston to Great Hale, the construction of two drains from there to Guthram, which were called the Double Twelves, and the construction of the Clay Dyke Drain. The scheme was not popular with the local fenmen, who made a living from fishing and wildfowling, or with the Commoners, who had a right to graze animals on the common land when it was not flooded. They attempted to get Parliament to rule in their favour, but after three years of trying, they abandoned the idea of legal redress, and took direct action. They destroyed much of the work, as well as buildings and crops, and burnt Skirbeck Sluice. The Earl of Lindsey's contract with the Commissioners of Sewers was revoked by parliament, and it was another hundred years before the next attempt to drain the area.

In an attempt to drain Holland Fen, and prevent flooding from the River Witham, an adventurer called Earl Fitzwilliam constructed a drain in 1720, which runs broadly parallel to the River Witham, and terminated at Lodewick's Gowt, a sluice which he constructed on the Witham close to the location of the present Grand Sluice. The drain was for many years called Earl Fitzwilliam's drain, but is now called the North Forty-Foot Drain. The scheme was not entirely successful.

Second Sluice
In 1762, the Witham Drainage Act was passed by Parliament, and among other things constituted the Commissioners of Sewers for the Second and Sixth District, which covered the area including Asgarby, Ewerby, Great Hale, Heckington, Holland Fen, Howell, Little Hale and South Kyme. The scheme largely revived the Earl of Lindsey's original scheme. The initial design work was carried out by the civil engineer Langley Edwards, on loan from the Witham Commissioners. Some of the surveying was performed by John Landen, who was the steward of the estate of Earl Fitzwilliam at Peterborough, and a proficient amateur mathematician. The two men were jointly appointed Surveyors of the Works, acting as engineers for the scheme, while John Chapman and Richard Strattard were assistants. The  of the drain were scoured from Boston to Great Hale, beyond which the Main Drain was upgraded by cutting a new  channel, effectively extending the South Forty-Foot Drain to Guthram, on the banks of the River Glen. The estimated cost of £16,000 was raised by issuing bonds, but the project overran, and another Act of Parliament was obtained in 1770 to authorise the raising of the drainage taxes, to cover the difference. By mid-1769, when Landen and Edwards left the project, because the work was largely complete, the scheme had cost £24,000. They were replaced by Edward Hare as Surveyor of Works, with Chapman and Strattard continuing as assistants. A historian called W. H. Wheeler, who chronicled the Lincolnshire fens, wrote that "the works were efficiently carried out and, being well-designed, entirely answered expectation."

On the River Witham, the Grand Sluice was constructed and opened on 15 October 1766, and this prevented tidal water from entering the river, and hence flooding the Holland Fen. The Boston Harbour Commissioners were created by the Boston Port Act 1766, and they carried out improvement works to The Haven, which resulted in lower water levels at the Black Sluice, and hence more efficient draining from the South Forty-Foot Drain. Water was pumped into the drain by a series of windmills driving scoop wheels. Extreme high tides in 1810 and again in 1820 resulted in widespread flooding, and further thought was given to improving the flood defences.

With the improvements to the River Witham, the final section of Earl Fitzwilliam's drain to Lodewick Gowt was filled in, and the channel was diverted to join the South Forty-Foot Drain. Renamed the North Forty-Foot Drain, it now supplies Cook's Lock and Holland Fen pumping stations.

Third Sluice
Reports on improvements to the system were produced in 1843 by the surveyor Mr W Lewin and in 1845 by Sir John Rennie. Rennie's scheme involved the provision of a catchwater drain to collect water draining from the higher ground to the west before it entered the fenlands, but an Act of Parliament to authorise its construction was defeated, and so in 1846 a report by Mr W Cubit which proposed improvements to the existing infrastructure was accepted by the Commissioners. Many of the tributary drains were also improved. 1846 also marked the beginning of the use of steam engines for pumping. Ten years later, a map covering  of the Black Sluice area showed nine steam-powered and eight wind-powered drainage engines in use.

The River Witham Outfall Improvement Act 1880 authorised further improvements to the mouth of the Witham, to which the Black Sluice Commissioners contributed £65,000. Oil and paraffin engines began to replace steam and wind engines from 1910, and by 1935 there were 15 such engines pumping water into the South Forty-Foot Drain. The passing of the Land Drainage Act 1930 resulted in the Commissioners being replaced by the Black Sluice Internal Drainage Board, while responsibility for the rivers in the area passed to the Witham and Steeping Rivers Catchment Board. With war imminent, the Rivers Board took over the Black Sluice and the South Forty-Foot Drain in 1939, and although progress was interrupted by the Second World War, a £374,000 scheme to construct the Black Sluice pumping station and to widen  of the drain from Boston to Donington Bridge was completed in 1946. The pumping station contained three  pumps, each powered by a  5-cylinder vertical diesel engine manufactured by Ruston.

Modern era
Paraffin and oil engines gave way to electrically powered pumping stations in the 1950s, with the Board constructing six electric and one diesel pumping station to improve drainage to an extra  of land. Jurisdiction for the Drain and the sluice passed to the Lincolnshire River Board at this time. The work, which began in 1962 and was completed in 1968, proved successful in preventing flooding during severe wet weather in the winter of 1968/9. With three  and two  diesel engines, the upgraded pumping station could pump 800 thousand gallons per minute (60 m3/s). Responsibility for the drain and the sluice passed to the National Rivers Authority in 1990, and to the Environment Agency in 1995.

Despite all the improvements, serious flooding occurred in 1999 when the bank of the drain was breached near Pinchbeck. Staff from the Environment Agency and the Black Sluice Internal Drainage Board successfully repaired the breach before properties were flooded, and a review of the flood defences was then carried out. The report recommended improvements to some of the banks, but funding for the work was not available, and so no work was done at the time.

In 2013, the pumping station flooded as a result of a tidal surge. The three engines dating from 1946 were damaged by water ingress, and were decommissioned. The other two engines were at a higher level, and remained operational, but were by that time nearly 50 years old, and nearing the end of their operational life. Refurbishment of the pumping station was estimated to cost between £15 and £20 million, and so the effectiveness of the station was reviewed. The review showed that it had been used for less than 2 days of every 100 days since it was constructed in 1946, and that the station barely affected the number of properties that might be flooded. By using the adjacent gravity sluice and the lock to discharge water from the South Forty-Foot Drain, better control of water levels could be achieved, and this had been demonstrated during a period of heavy rainfall in spring 2018. Accordingly, the remaining two pumps were decommissioned in October 2018, and the Environment Agency are looking at what to do with the building.

Functions

The South Forty-Foot Drain serves as a district boundary over the length where it runs roughly south to north. South of Donington High Bridge, the Drain separates South Kesteven to the west from South Holland to the east. The boundary then continues southwards along the River Glen. North of Donington, the boundary between the borough of Boston to the east and North Kesteven to the west follows the line of the Drain. As the Drain crosses the line of the Midfen Dyke, just before the Nottingham to Boston railway joins it at Great Hale pumping station, the boundary turns northwards, following its medieval course.

The main job of the Drain is to gather the waters pumped from the Kesteven Fens, the Holland Fens and the Weir Dyke, a soak dike in Bourne North Fen, alongside the Bourne Eau and River Glen, northwards and eastwards to the Black Sluice at Boston, where they are discharged to the tidal waters of The Haven. The Weir Dyke takes its name from a weir in the bank of the Bourne Eau at Tongue End, which was constructed by the Black Sluice Commissioners, to allow water from the Bourne Eau to overflow the bank when excess water could not flow into the River Glen in times of flood. The overfall weir became redundant when the Tongue End pumping station was constructed in 1966.

The South Forty-Foot Drain and the Black Sluice pumping station, together with most of the side channels which run into the drain are the responsibility of the Environment Agency. Management of the drainage ditches which drain the Fens are the responsibility of the Black Sluice Internal Drainage Board, who maintain 34 pumping stations and three gravity stations in the region. Of these, 21 are situated on the banks of the Drain, and pump directly into it, while one, the Black Hole Drove pumping station, is constructed over the channel, and acts as a boundary between the part of the Drain managed by the Environment Agency, and that managed by the Drainage Board.

Navigation

It was only open to commercial craft, as pleasure craft were expressly prohibited. It is unclear whether there was ever a right of navigation, or whether the Black Sluice Commissioners simply allowed it. Navigation ceased in 1971, when the lock was closed and removed, with little protest being made. More recently, the East Anglian Waterways Association promoted the idea that the Drain could again be made navigable as part of a larger scheme to improve leisure facilities. The local authorities which were part of the Fens Tourism consortium conducted a feasibility study, and this report was formally adopted as the Fens Waterways Link by the Environment Agency in 2004, with the support of the local authorities, the East Anglian Waterways Association and the Inland Waterways Association.

When completed, it would connect the Rivers Witham, Glen, Welland, Nene and Great Ouse, and was heralded as the biggest waterway enhancement project in Europe by the Environment Agency.
In 2007 they obtained funding for the link between Boston and Spalding.  Work on a new lock beside the Black Sluice pumping station at Boston - to connect The Haven and the South Forty-Foot Drain - was formally started on 8 February 2008, and was completed in December 2008, with the official opening ceremony being held on 20 March 2009. The lock project formed phase 1 of the scheme, and the cost of £8.5 million was jointly funded by the European Regional Development Fund, the East Midlands Development Agency, and Lincolnshire County Council. The lock is designed to be used for a period either side of high tide, and so there is a rise from the Drain to the Haven. It has conventional mitre gates at one end, but uses rotating sector gates at the tidal end, each one weighing 12.1 tonnes.

As part of the upgrade, new 48-hour moorings were constructed on The Haven, for boats about to enter the Drain, and on the South Forty-Foot Drain near the Black Sluice pumping station at Boston, at Swineshead Bridge and at Hubbert's Bridge.
The upper limit of navigation was initially Donington High Bridge, where the Swaton Eau joins the South Forty-Foot Drain and provides a wider section where boats can be turned. Beyond the bridge, the drain was officially only suitable for canoes and kayaks.
However, eight narrow boats cruised on the waterway at Easter 2009, and although the channel was narrower and not as deep after Donington Bridge, all of them successfully reached Kingston's Bridge, some  further on, where the outlets from Dowsby Fen and Gosberton pumping stations provided enough width to turn a  boat. Further progress was blocked by scaffolding erected so that the bridge could be re-decked, rather than by lack of water.

The drain has been renamed as the Black Sluice Navigation by the Environment Agency. In order to use the navigation, an Environment Agency licence is required, and as there are no permanent moorings available on the drain, these are available for one day or seven days.
Water levels are maintained at a lower level during the winter months, when flows are high, and the Drain needs to be able to cope with higher volumes of rainfall, than during the summer months, when navigable levels are maintained. As on the neighbouring River Witham, the switch between winter and summer levels is normally made at the beginning of April.

Development
Phase 2 of the Fens Waterway project involves the link between Donington Bridge and Crowland and Cowbit Washes, which are located on the River Welland near Spalding. In order to make the financing of the phase more viable, it was split into two halves, with phase 2a covering the section from Donington to Surfleet Seas End on the River Glen, and phase 2b covering from there onwards. The initial technical assessment and obtaining of planning permission for phase 2, which involved widening of the South Forty-Foot Drain from Donington to a new road crossing under the A151, a new lock and a junction with the River Glen at Guthram Gowt was funded by the East Midlands Development Agency. This section would involve changes at Black Hole Drove pumping station, which has been built across the drain and hence would prevent navigation. Major contracts for this phase were expected to be awarded in April 2009, but appraisal of the technical assessment revealed that more than one route needed to be considered before the best solution could be selected. In the meantime, the economic situation changed, so that sources of funding were not so freely available, and by the end of 2010, no clear dates had been set for the next construction phase.

By late 2011, there were ten different routes under consideration, and an assessment of them was expected to be delivered in spring 2012. Halcrow Group, the engineering consultancy, were responsible for carrying out the assessment, which looked at the benefits that each route might provide, not only for navigation but also for water quality, water resources and habitat for wildlife. The study was expected to provide a short-list of routes, which would then be the subject of further consultation.
By mid-2012, the merits of the ten routes had been considered, including the economic, environmental and technical issues involved, and a broad outline of the corridor for the link was scheduled to be published in September. After that, consultation with landowners and stakeholders took place, to establish the final route, for which design of the channel and the associated locks, bridges, moorings and pumping stations could then begin.
By the end of the assessment process for the ten routes, two remained. One was route 1, the original suggestion which used the existing course of the South Forty-Foot Drain for most of its length, while the second was a new route, designated as route 11. Route 11 had become the preferred route by the summer of 2014. It involves widening the South Forty-Foot Drain from Donington to Surfleet, to a point near to the Black Hole Drove pumping station. A new lock would be needed at this location, but would connect to a new channel, rather than to the rest of the drain. It would pass under a new bridge on the A151, and the connection to the River Glen would involve another new lock. An environmental survey of other watercourses near to the route revealed that several provide habitat for nationally important plants and invertebrates.

Precursors
The idea of a link between the South Forty-Foot Drain and the River Nene is not new, as the first plans for such a connection were proposed in 1809. In that year, proposals for a new canal between the Oakham Canal at Oakham and the Stamford Canal at Stamford, which had been discussed in 1785, were revived, as part of a larger plan for a  link from Stamford to the River Nene at Peterborough, and a connection from near Market Deeping, where the Stamford Canal rejoined the River Welland, northwards to the South Forty-Foot Drain. A bill for this, together with one for a rival scheme to link Stamford to the Grand Junction Canal, which also included a connection to the South Forty-Foot Drain, were put before Parliament in 1811, but neither met with any success. The idea was raised again in 1815 and 1828, but no further action was taken.

Route

Water quality
The Environment Agency measure the water quality of the river systems in England. Each is given an overall ecological status, which may be one of five levels: high, good, moderate, poor and bad. There are several components that are used to determine this, including biological status, which looks at the quantity and varieties of invertebrates, angiosperms and fish. Chemical status, which compares the concentrations of various chemicals against known safe concentrations, is rated good or fail. The South Forty-Foot Drain is designated as "heavily modified", which means that the channels have been altered by human activity, and the criteria for this designation are defined by the Water Framework Directive.

The water quality of the South Forty-Foot Drain was as follows in 2019.

Reasons for the water quality being less than good include physical modification of the channel, which prevents the free movement of fish and other organisms along the waterway, discharge from sewage treatment works, and runoff from agricultural land. Like many waterways in the UK, the chemical status was rated as fail in 2019, due to the presence of polybrominated diphenyl ethers (PBDE) and mercury compounds, neither of which had previously been included in the assessment. Prior to 2019, there were issues with tributyltin compounds being discharged into the system, which also affected chemical status.

See also

Canals of Great Britain
History of the British canal system
Fens Waterways Link

Bibliography

References

External links
 

Canals in Lincolnshire
Drainage canals in England
Inland navigations